Give Up the Ghost is the third studio album by American singer-songwriter Brandi Carlile, released on October 6, 2009, through Columbia Records. The album was produced by Grammy Award winner Rick Rubin and contains a collaboration with Elton John titled "Caroline". Recorded at Sunset Sound in Los Angeles, the album also features Chad Smith, Amy Ray and Benmont Tench.

"Dreams", the first single from the album, was released on Carlile's website on August 14, and was available for download on August 18.

Track listing
All songs written by Carlile, unless noted otherwise.

 "Looking Out" – 4:18
 "Dying Day" (Tim Hanseroth) – 3:33
 "Pride and Joy" – 4:20
 "Dreams" (Carlile, Phil Hanseroth, Tim Hanseroth) – 3:31
 "That Year" – 3:35
 "Caroline" (Carlile, Phil Hanseroth, Tim Hanseroth) – 3:36
 "Before It Breaks" (Carlile, Phil Hanseroth, Tim Hanseroth) – 3:57
 "I Will" – 4:09
 "If There Was No You" (Carlile, Phil Hanseroth) – 2:39
 "Touching the Ground" (Tim Hanseroth) – 3:17
 "Oh Dear" (Carlile, Phil Hanseroth) – 2:50

Personnel
Brandi Carlile – banjo, acoustic guitar, electric guitar, piano, lead vocals, background vocals
Jesse Carmichael – mellotron
Lenny Castro – percussion
Gibb Droll – dobro, slide guitar
Phil Hanseroth – bass guitar, upright bass, electric guitar, percussion, ukulele, background vocals, Wurlitzer
Tim Hanseroth – drums, electric guitar, percussion, background vocals
Jacob Hoffman – piano
Victor Indrizzo – drums, percussion
Elton John – piano, background vocals
Paul Buckmaster – arrangements
Josh Neumann – cello
Jason Lader – synthesizer
Amy Ray – background vocals
Chad Smith – drums, percussion
Benmont Tench – organ, piano

Charts

Awards
In 2010, Brandi Carlile was nominated for a GLAAD Media Award for "Outstanding Music Artist" for the album Give Up the Ghost during the 21st GLAAD Media Awards.

References

External links
Brandi Carlile's official site

Brandi Carlile albums
2009 albums
Albums produced by Rick Rubin